Yanai (written: 柳井, 柳内 or 箭内) is a Japanese surname. Notable people with the surname include:

Hiroshi Yanai (disambiguation), multiple people
, Japanese astronomer
, Japanese pornographic actor
, Japanese writer
, Japanese billionaire

Japanese-language surnames